Llanarth may refer to:

 Llanarth, Ceredigion
 Llanarth, Monmouthshire
 Llanarth, Queensland
 Llanarth, New South Wales
 Llanarth (house), New South Wales